Several units of measurements are used in Puerto Rico. The units of measure in use in Puerto Rico are based on the United States customary units with two major exceptions: roadway distance signs are measured in kilometers and gasoline is sold by the liter.

System before US customary units 
Several units were used before the US takeover in 1898.  These units were older Spanish units.

Area
Several units were used to measure area.  Among them were the cuerda and the caballería.

Cuerda
In Puerto Rico, a cuerda is a traditional unit of land area nearly equivalent to 3,930 square meters, or 4,700 square yards, 0.971 acre, or 0.393 hectare (ha). The precise conversion is 1 cuerda = 3,930.395625 m2. The term "Spanish acre" instead has been used sometimes by mainlanders. A cuerda and an acre have often been treated as equal because they are nearly the same size. It continues to be an official unit of land measure in Puerto Rico today (2019).

Caballería

This was a unit of land measurement in the Spanish Viceroyalties in the Americas during the times of the Spanish Empire in the 16th through 19th centuries Puerto Rico. This unit of measure is now (2019) obsolete.

References

 Archived at the WayBack Machine on 16 August 2013, from the original Units: C: cuerda. Russ Rowlett. The University of North Carolina at Chapel Hill. 
 ^ Jump up to: a b c d e f Units - Cuerda. Sizes.com. Puerto Rico Act 135, section 4 (page 100), 1913–14, as amended by Act No. 3, 1913–14: A cuerda, quote: "a unit of land area, approximately 3,930 square meters (approximately 0.971 acres)...In land measurements and records, the measurement by cuerda customarily used in Porto [sic] Rico...equivalent to 3,930.395625 square meters..."

Puerto Rican culture
Puerto Rico